England captain and similar terms normally refer to the head player in a sports team that represents England. 

Lists of England captains include:

List of England cricket captains 
List of England national football team captains

For captains in other sports, see the corresponding articles on those sports.